Universe 15 is an anthology of original science fiction short stories edited by Terry Carr, the fifteenth volume in the seventeen-volume Universe anthology series. It was first published in hardcover by Doubleday in August 1985, with a paperback edition from Tor Books in December 1987.

The book collects ten novelettes and short stories by various science fiction authors.

Contents
 "Mercurial" (Kim Stanley Robinson)
 "Paladin of the Lost Hour" (Harlan Ellison)
 "Giraffe Tuesday" (Juleen Brantingham)
 "Evergreen" (Arthur Jean Cox)
 "Mengele" (Lucius Shepard)
 "Originals" (Pamela Sargent)
 "Johann Sebastian Brahms" (Barry N. Malzberg)
 "Encounter on the Ladder" (Mona A. Clee)
 "Tidal Effects" (Jack McDevitt)
 "The Slovo Stove" (Avram Davidson)

Awards
The anthology placed fifth in the 1986 Locus Poll Award for Best Anthology.

"Mercurial" placed thirteenth in the 1986 Locus Poll Award for Best Novelette.

"Paladin of the Lost Hour" won the 1986 Hugo Award, placed first in the Locus Poll Award, and was nominated for the SF Chronicle and Nebula Awards, in each instance for Best Novelette.

"Mengele" placed sixth in the 1986 Locus Poll Award for Best Short Story.

"The Slovo Stove" was nominated for the 1986 World Fantasy Award for Best Short Fiction and placed seventeenth in the 1986 Locus Poll Award for Best Novelette.

References

1985 anthologies
Universe (anthology series)
Doubleday (publisher) books